Bayada Home Health Care (stylized BAYADA) is an international nonprofit home health care provider. Founded in 1975, BAYADA has more than 360 offices in 23 states, with locations in Germany, India, Ireland, New Zealand, and South Korea.

Originally a provider of home health aide services (also known as assistive care, or personal care services), Bayada expanded its services to include additional home health care services for people of all ages and abilities.

Company overview 
Headquartered in suburban Philadelphia, PA, USA, with a Global Support Center in Pennsauken, NJ, BAYADA Home Health Care employs more than 28,000 nurses, home health aides, therapists, medical social workers, and other home health care professionals as well as business support staff. In May 2019, BAYADA reached a milestone of serving its one millionth client.

BAYADA provides nursing, rehabilitative, therapeutic, hospice, and assistive care services to children, adults, and seniors. In some states, BAYADA offers behavioral health and habilitation services.

History 
On January 17, 1975, Bayada Home Health Care was established as RN Homecare, by J. Mark Baiada in Philadelphia, Pennsylvania. In 1983, the name of the company was changed to Bayada Nurses, representing the Baiada family and staff of nursing professionals. On the company's 37th anniversary, Bayada Nurses rebranded as BAYADA Home Health Care in order to better encompass the organization's services and the work performed by the staff of nursing professionals.

In 2011, the company was awarded the HomeCare Elite Award and the Pennsylvania Homecare Association Award.

, Bayada Home Health Care operates more than 360 offices in 26 states, as well as India. The company employs more than 28,000 nurses, home health aides, therapists, medical social workers, and other health care professionals.
The company ranks as #14 on the list of largest employers in Philadelphia and has been on. The privately held company stated 2018 revenue of $1.3B. In 2018, Forbes magazine named Bayada a "Forbes Best Employer for New Grads 2018".

Nonprofit transition 
On August 17, 2017, Mark Baiada retired as CEO of Bayada and announced that his family would gift their privately-owned business to transition into a nonprofit organization by January 2019. On the same date, Mark’s son David Baiada, who has worked in the company since 2002, assumed the position of CEO, and Mark Baiada became Chair of the new nonprofit’s Board of Trustees. On December 31, 2018, BAYADA officially transitioned from a family-owned, for profit company to a nonprofit organization.

Accreditation 
Bayada Home Health Care is CHAP-accredited for delivering home health care.

Bayada's Pediatric RN Residency Program is the only one in-home care accredited with distinction by the American Nurses Credentialing Center (ANCC).

Innovations 
In 1998, Bayada launched BAYADAbility Rehab Solutions, the a specialized in-home rehabilitative nursing program for people with catastrophic diagnoses.

In 2011, Bayada launched a simulation (SIM) lab training program in-home care, subsequently offered in more than 50 locations.

References 

Health care companies established in 1975
Health care companies based in New Jersey
Nursing in the United States
Community nursing
Caregiving
Geriatrics
American companies established in 1975
1975 establishments in Pennsylvania
Privately held companies based in New Jersey